Benedetto Gennari (1563–1610) was an Italian painter of the early-Baroque period, active mainly in Ferrara and Cento.

His birthplace is poorly recorded. He adopted a style influenced by Caravaggio, and by age 19, was working in the household of Mirandola in Cento. In that town, he helped decorate the Palazzo della communita and the church of Spirito Santo. Guercino became his apprentice in 1607. 
His nephews Benedetto II Gennari and Cesare Gennari, sons of his brother Ercole Gennari, were also painters.

References

 

Italian Baroque painters
1563 births
1658 deaths
Italian male painters
People from Cento
16th-century Italian painters
17th-century Italian painters